This is a list of protected areas of Saudi Arabia:

List of designated protected areas 
There are 15 designated protected areas in Saudi Arabia which are managed by the Saudi Wildlife Authority.

 At-Taysiyah Protected Area
 Jabal Shada Nature Reserve
 Majami'al-Hadb Protected Area
 Nafud al-'Urayq
 Raydah Natural Reserve
 'Uruq Bani Ma'arid
Saja Umm Ar-Rimth Natural Reserve
Harrat al-Harrah Protected Area
Al-Khunfah Natural Reserve
 Ibex Reserve Protected Area
 Mahazat as-Sayd Protected Area
 Umm al-Qamari Islands
Al-Tubayq Natural Reserve
 Farasan Islands Protected Area
 Jubail Marine Wildlife Sanctuary

List of proposed protected areas 

Abu Ali/Dawhat and Dafi Musallamiyah Complex
Abu Duda
Ad-Dahna (Hawmat an-Niqyan) Nature Reserve
Ad-Dahna Waterfall
Al Hair Wetland
Al Hasani and Libana Islands
Al Hassa/Uqair National Recreation Area
Al Muwailih
Al Uqayr Bay
Al Wahbah Natural Monument
Al-Ahsa Protected Area
Al-Haram al-Madani
Al-Haram al-Makki
Al-Hawtah Nature Reserve
Al-Hijr Protected Landscape
Al-Jandaliyah Protected Area

Al-Mansuriyah and Al-Hair Dam Bird Sanctuary
Al-Wahba
Al-Wajh Bank
Aqabat ash-Sha'ar
Arabiyah Island
Ar-Rub'al-Khali Wildlife Management Area
Ash-Shu'aybah and Mastaba
Asir National Park
At Tawil
Ath Thamamah
Ath-Thumamah Managed Nature Reserve
At-Tawil Managed Nature Reserve

Sharm Zubeir coastline
Dahl Maaqala Protected Area
Dawat Ad-Dafl, Dawat Al-Musallamiyah and Coral Islands Marine Wildlife Sanctuary
Dhahran Reserve
Farasan Islands Protected Area
Ghubbat Bal'aksh
Gulf Conservation Area
Haramil Island
Harqus Island

Harrat ar-Raha Nature Reserve
Hawtat Bani Tamin
Hema Hureimla National Park
Hima Huraymila' National Park
Humaydah Beach
Huraymila' Traditional Reserve

Jabal Aja Protected Area
Jabal al-Lawz/Hisma Nature Reserve
Jabal Athrab Nature Reserve
Jabal Dibbagh Nature Reserve
Jabal Ibrahim/Wadi Buwwah Protected Area
Jabal Ral Hima Traditional Reserve
Jabal Salma Nature Reserve

Jabal Tuwayq Nature Reserve
Jabel Ibrahim Wadi Buwwah Protected Area
Jabul Letub National Nature Reserve
Jana Island
Jeddah Salt Marshes
Jibal al-Humrah/Riyadh Jabal Mukallibah Nature Reserve
Jurayd Island
Karan Island
Khawr al Ja'afirah Area and Islands
Khawr Itwad
Khawr Nahoud
Khawr Wahlan
Khaybar Saltmarshes Nature Reserve
Khor Al Wahla
Khor Amiq and Raqa
Kurayn Island
Layla Lakes Nature Reserve

Maqna North Beach
Marqa Island
Marsa al Usalla
Marsa Umm Misk
Mastura Beach
Mersa as Sarraj
Mersa Tawil

Najran Desert Nature Reserve
North and South Sharm Wasm and Al Quhma and Qadimbal Islands
North Inner Farasan Bank Reefs and Islands
North Outer Farasan Bank Reefs and Islands
Northern Wildlife Management Zone Wildlife Management Area
Oreste Point
Qalib Island Chain
Qaryat al Fau Al-Arid Nature Reserve
Qishran
Ras Abu Madd to Sharm Hasi
Ras Baridi and Sharm al Khaur
Ras Hatiba
Ras Suwayhil
Rawdat Khuraym Nature Reserve

Safaniya/Manifa Bay Complex

Shada Hima Traditional Reserve
Sharm Dumagha and Sharm Antar
Sharm Habban to Sharm Munaybirah
Sharm Yahar to Saharm Jubba
Sharm Yanbu
Sharm Zubayr
Shi'b Abu al-Liqa and Shi'b al-Kabir
Shib Al Kabir
Shi'b Green Reef Complex
South Gulf of Salwah
South Jizan Beach
South Qunfidah
Tabuk Wetlands Bird Sanctuary
Tarut Bay Complex

Umm Lajj

Wadi an-Naaman/Wadi Wajj Nature Reserve
Wadi Hizmah Protected Area
Wadi Jawrah
Wadi Jizan Reservoir Bird Sanctuary
Wadi Murwani Nature Reserve
Wadi Qirshah Protected Landscape
Wadi Rabigh Nature Reserve
Wadi Turabah Nature Reserve
Wadi Ulayb Nature Reserve
Yanbu City Conservation Area
Yanbu Coastal Conservation Area

References

World Database on Protected Areas

 
Saudi Arabia
Protected areas